New Dark Age is the ninth studio album by Djam Karet, released on May 22, 2001, by Cuneiform Records.

Track listing

Personnel 
Adapted from New Dark Age liner notes.

Djam Karet
 Gayle Ellett – electric guitar, organ, mellotron, synthesizer, electronics
 Mike Henderson – electric guitar, acoustic guitar, 12-string acoustic guitar, slide guitar, synthesizer, tape, electronics, percussion
 Chuck Oken, Jr. – drums, percussion, synthesizer
 Henry J. Osborne – bass guitar, percussion

Additional musicians
 Loren Nerell – synthesizer (4, 10)
 Dion Sorell – cello (6)
Production and additional personnel
 Djam Karet – production
 Bill Ellsworth – cover art, design

Release history

References

External links 
 New Dark Age at Discogs (list of releases)
 New Dark Age at Bandcamp

2001 albums
Djam Karet albums
Cuneiform Records albums